Lloyd F. Gullickson (March 23, 1899 – May 7, 1982) was an American professional golfer who played in the early-to-mid 20th century. As an amateur he won the 1917 and 1918 Chicago Amateur Championships, on both occasions using borrowed clubs.  He turned professional in 1919 and later posted good finishes in the U.S. Open and PGA Championship.

His best U.S. Open finish was T28 in 1922 and his best PGA Championship effort came in 1920 when he finished T17. Gullickson won the 1934 Ohio Open as well as six other professional tournaments.

Early life
Gullickson, who was born in 1899 in Illinois,  learned golf by first starting out as a caddie at the Jackson Park Golf Course in Chicago, Illinois. He grew up under difficult circumstances when he became orphaned at age 11 when his mother, a poor upholsterer, died. Among others, he carried the bag of Chick Evans at Jackson Park who would later help Gullickson obtain his first pro posting at Lake Shore Golf Club in Braeside, Illinois.

Golf career

Amateur golf career
He won the 1917 Chicago Amateur Championship and while serving in the U.S. Navy at Naval Station Great Lakes during World War I, he took a leave of absence to play in and win the tournament again in 1918. He was unable to afford his own clubs at the time and won both tournaments using borrowed clubs. Known as a long hitter of the ball, he turned professional in 1919.

Pro golf career
Gullickson had a number of starts in the U.S. Open and PGA Championship. In the U.S. Open, his finest performance was T28 in 1922 and his best PGA Championship effort came in 1920 when he finished T17.

By 1926 he was serving as the head professional at The Elks Country Club in McDermott, Ohio. He later served at Westwood Country Club in Rocky River, Ohio, for the 1927 season. He won the Ohio Open in 1934 – as well as six other professional tournaments – and was hired as the head professional at the Inverness Club in 1945, succeeding Byron Nelson. He remained at Inverness as the summer professional until his retirement in 1965. During the winters, Gullickson served at the Pasadena Golf Club in St. Petersburg, Florida.

Memorable match
In 1934, Gullickson partnered with fellow pro Babe Didrikson in a match against amateurs Glenna Collett-Vare and Babe Ruth which they won quite easily. The match raised $600 for a crippled children's hospital in St. Petersburg, Florida. A number of gallery members were betting which of the "Babes" would hit the longest drive on each hole. Didrikson jokingly said that she could outdrive Ruth standing on one leg.

Death and legacy
Gullickson died in May 1982 in Pinellas County, Florida. He is best remembered as an American touring golf professional with a number of good finishes in golf major championships and as the longtime head professional at the Inverness Club in Toledo, Ohio, where he worked for 20 years.

Professional wins (7)
1934 Ohio Open
1938 Erie Open
1945 Toledo Open
Cleveland Open (three times)
Cambridge Springs Open
Source:

Results in major championships

Note: Gullickson never played in the Masters Tournament or The Open Championship.

DNP = Did not play
CUT = Missed the half-way cut
T = Tied for a place
? = Unknown
R64, R32, R16, QF, SF = Round in which player lost in PGA Championship match play
Yellow background for top-10

Sources:

References

American male golfers
PGA Tour golfers
Golfers from Illinois
Golfers from Ohio
Golfers from Florida
1899 births
1982 deaths